Vaghashen is a village in the Martuni Municipality of the Gegharkunik Province of Armenia.

Toponymy 
The village was known as Avdalagalu or Abdalaghalu until 1935.

History 
There are two 16th-century churches in the village, and nearby are the ruins of Kyurdi Kogh and Aloyi Kogh cyclopean forts.

Gallery

References

External links 

 World Gazeteer: Armenia – World-Gazetteer.com
 
 

Populated places in Gegharkunik Province